The Year-End charts for the Regional Mexican Albums chart in the 1990s are published in the last issue of Billboard magazine every year. The chart was based on information provided by Nielsen Broadcast Data Systems, which collected a survey from music retail shops and one-stop sales in the United States until May 1991 when the methodology was changed to include point-of-sale data compiled from Nielsen SoundScan. The Year-End charts represent aggregated numbers from the weekly charts that were compiled for each artist, album and record company.

Mexican group Bronco had the best-selling album of 1990 with A Todo Galope. Beginning in 1992, Tejano music musicians dominated the year-end chart for five consecutive years; with La Mafia having the best-selling album of the year with their critically acclaimed recording Estas Tocando Fuego. Selena had the best-selling album of the year from 1993 to 1996 with Entre a Mi Mundo and Amor Prohibido (1994–96). The former became the only recording in the 1990s to have been named the best-selling Regional Mexican Album of the year for three consecutive times. The singer became the only female musician to have a year-end best-seller in the 1990s. Selena continued her streak of best-selling year-end albums with Anthology (1998) and All My Hits/Todos Mis Exitos (1999) following her death in March 1995. Other female singers to have appeared on the year-end chart includes Mexican singer Ana Gabriel whose album Mi Mexico was the second best-seller of 1992, while Gabriel's Con Un Mismo Corazon ranked fifth in 1998. Linda Ronstadt's double diamond certified album Canciones de Mi Padre ranked eighth and third on the year-end charts in 1993 and 1994, respectively. Grupo Límite's previous work, Por Puro Amor peaked at number one on the Regional Mexican Albums chart in 1996, it was replaced from the top with their album Partiendome el Alma; which became the best-selling album of 1997.
 
In 1995, Tejano musicians dominated the year-end chart with eight best-selling albums in the top ten; most of these were Selena. Seven different Tejano singers ranked within the top ten of the best-selling albums of 1996. Following this, the only performers of Tejano music that appeared in the top ten were Selena and Intocable; whose albums IV (1998) and Contigo (1999) ranked tenth in their respective years. Los Tigres del Norte placed a total of eight albums within the top ten including Jefe de Jefes, which is one of the best-selling Latin albums in the United States.

Regional Mexican Albums of the Year

  – represents the best-performing single of the year.

Sources: 1990, 1992, 1993, 1994, 1995, 1996, 1997, 1998, 1999,

References

Regional Mexican Albums Year-end Chart, 1990s
Regional Mexican music albums
United States Regional Mexican